Sandro Veronesi may refer to:
 Sandro Veronesi (writer)
 Sandro Veronesi (entrepreneur)